Ernst Günther Jakob Knödler (10 January 1925 – 3 August 1996) was a German fencer who competed for Saar at the 1952 Summer Olympics. He fenced in the individual and team foil and sabre events.

See also
 Saar at the 1952 Summer Olympics

References

External links
 

1925 births
1996 deaths
German male fencers
Olympic fencers of Saar
Fencers at the 1952 Summer Olympics